In Russia, the Word of the Year  poll is carried out since 2007 by the Expert Council of the Centre for Creative Development of the Russian Language headed by Russian-American philologist Mikhail Epstein.

2015
In December 2015, Epstein reported in his blog "Snob" the following results.

Word of the year: БЕЖЕНЦЫ (Refugees), in reference to the refugee from Middle East.
Phrase of the year:: НЕМЦОВ МОСТ (Nemtsov's Bridge), a suggestion to rename the bridge where Russian opposition leader Boris Nemtsov was assassinated.
Anti-language: ОБАМА - ЧМО (Obama chmo, "Obama the schmuck")
Neololgism: БЕССМЕРТНЫЙ БАРАК (Immortal Barrack, by Андрей Десницкий). The term was coined in an analogy to the "Immortal Regiment". The latter was an annual action to commemorate the nameless heroes perished in Great Partiotic War. The "Immortal Barrack" action was suggested to commemorate the perished in Stalinist Gulag labor camps.

2016
In December 2016, Epstein reported in his blog "Snob" the following results.

Word of the year: БРЕКСИТ (BREXIT), in reference to Brexit.
Phrase of the year:: ОЧЕРЕДЬ НА СЕРОВА/АЙВАЗОВСКОГО (Queue to Serov and Aivazovsky exhibitions, famous Russian artists of the 19th c.; there were huge queues to their exhibitions at Moscow Tretiakov gallery).
Anti-language: "Денег нет, но вы держитесь"  (“There is no money for you, but you should stand firm" (Dmitry Medvedev's response to someone complaining about pensions in Crimea))
Neololgism: 1.ЗЛОВЦО (Evil word). 2.НЕУЕЗЖАНТ Non–leaver  – the one who has the opportunity to emigrate but prefers to stay in Russia.

2017
In December 2017, Epstein reported in his blog "Snob" the following results.
 
Word of the year: РЕНОВАЦИЯ (renovation), in reference to the program on new housing in Moscow.
Phrase of the year:: ОН ВАМ НЕ ДИМОН (He is not Dimon for you, in reference to the title of A. Navalnyi's film on Dmitriy (Dimon) Medvedev)
Anti-language: Иностранный агент (Foreign agent)
Neololgism: 1.ГОП-ПОЛИТИКА, ГОП-ЖУРНАЛИСТИКА, ГОП-РЕЛИГИЯ (hoo–hoo–politics, hoo–hoo–journalism, hoo–hoo–religion, from Russian "gop-", "gopota" referring to "hoodlum" and "hooliganism" in various aspects of social life). 2. ДОМОГАНТ (harasser, in reference to sex–scandals in the USA)

Previous years
 2007 — гламур ("glamour")
 2008 — кризис ("crisis", Great Recession)
 2009 — перезагрузка ("reset", Russian reset)
 2010 — огнеборцы ("firefighters", 2010 Russian wildfires)
 2011 — полиция ("police")
 2012 — Болотная (Bolotnaya Square)
 2013 — госдура (Gosdura, a pun with Gosduma, a Russian acronym for State Duma, dura is the feminine for durak, "fool")
 2014 — крымнаш (Krymnash, a contraction of "Крым наш", "Crimea is Ours")
 2015 — беженцы ("refugees", European migrant crisis)
 2016 — Брексит ("Brexit")
 2017 — реновация (program of renovation of housing in Moscow)
 2018 — Новичок ("Novichok" )

References

 Russian-language "Word of the Year 2015": "СЛОВО ГОДА-2015. ИТОГИ ВЫБОРОВ" 
 Russian-language "Word of the Year 2016": "Куда движется язык? Слова и лейтмотивы 2016 года" 
 Russian-language "Word of the Year 2017": "СЛОВО-2017. Вербальный портрет года" 

Russian language
Russia

ru:Слово года#Россия